Panasonic Lumix DMC-SZ7 is a digital camera by Panasonic Lumix. The highest-resolution pictures it records is 16.6 megapixels, through its 25mm Ultra Wide Angle Leica DC VARIO-ELMAR.

Property
10x optical zoom
capture HD video
12 in-camera creative effects

References

External links
DMC-SZ7K on shop.panasonic.com

Point-and-shoot cameras
SZ7